Vsevolod Mavrikievich Klechkovsky (also transliterated as Klechkovskii and Klechkowski; November 28, 1900 – May 2, 1972) was a Soviet and Russian agricultural chemist known for his work with radioisotopes.

Biography
He graduated in 1929 from the Moscow agricultural academy and worked there from 1930. He became a professor in 1955, and an academician of the All-Union Academy of Agricultural Sciences of the Soviet Union (known as VASKhNIL) in 1956.

His use of isotopic labeling in the advance of soil chemistry led to his being considered a founder of agricultural radiology. He was one of the first to study plant nutrition using radioisotopes, for which he received the Stalin Prize in 1952 along with his academy co-workers. He studied the behavior of heavy nuclei daughter isotopes in soils.

Following the 1957 Kyshtym disaster, Klechkovsky led the research projects studying the long-term effects of radioactive contamination at the site.

Klechkovsky also studied theoretical chemistry, and proposed a theoretical justification of the empirical Madelung rule for the ordering of atomic orbital energies. This rule is therefore sometimes called Klechkovsky's rule, especially in Russian and in French sources.

References

1900 births
1972 deaths
20th-century Russian chemists
Scientists from Moscow
Academicians of the VASKhNIL
Stalin Prize winners
Recipients of the Order of Lenin
Recipients of the Order of the Red Banner of Labour
People involved with the periodic table
Russian chemists
Soviet chemists